Nelli Mikhaylovna Abramova (born 18 August 1940, in Chelyabinsk) is a Jewish former Soviet competitive female volleyball player. She is an Olympic silver medallist (in 1964) and European champion (in 1967).

Career
Abramova played from 1956 until 1975, for clubs in the Russian SFSR and the Ukrainian SSR, winning the USSR Cup in 1974. She played for the Soviet Union national team from 1964 to 1967 becoming an Olympic silver medallist (in 1964), Universiade champion (in 1965) and European champion (in 1967).

Clubs
  Trud Chelyabinsk (1956–1962)
  Spartak Irkutsk (1962–1966)
  Burevestnik Odessa / Medin Odessa (1966–1975)

Honours and awards
 Merited Master of Sports of the USSR (1971)

National team
 1964 Olympic Games – Silver medal
 1965 Summer Universiade – Gold medal
 1967 European Championship – Gold medal

Clubs
 1974 USSR Cup (champion with Medin Odessa)

See also
List of select Jewish volleyball players

References

External links
 

1940 births
Living people
Soviet Jews
Soviet women's volleyball players
Jewish women's volleyball players
Olympic volleyball players of the Soviet Union
Volleyball players at the 1964 Summer Olympics
Olympic silver medalists for the Soviet Union
Olympic medalists in volleyball
Sportspeople from Chelyabinsk
Medalists at the 1964 Summer Olympics
Honoured Masters of Sport of the USSR
Universiade medalists in volleyball
Universiade gold medalists for the Soviet Union